The 1992 Rutgers Scarlet Knights football team represented Rutgers University in the 1992 NCAA Division I-A football season. In their third season under head coach Doug Graber, the Scarlet Knights compiled a 7–4 record, outscored their opponents 341 to 245, and finished in third place in the Big East Conference. The team's statistical leaders included Bryan Fortay with 1,608 passing yards, Bruce Presley with 817 rushing yards, and James Guarantino with 755 receiving yards.

Schedule

References

Rutgers
Rutgers Scarlet Knights football seasons
Rutgers Scarlet Knights football